Unpredictable is the second studio album by American singer-songwriter and actor Jamie Foxx. It was released on December 27, 2005, by J Records. The album was supported by four singles: "Extravaganza" featuring Kanye West, the title track "Unpredictable" featuring Ludacris, "DJ Play a Love Song" featuring Twista, and "Can I Take U Home".

Upon its release, Unpredictable received generally mixed reviews from music critics, who were ambivalent towards its lyrical content and production. The album debuted at number two on the US Billboard 200 chart, selling 597,000 copies in its first week and has since peaked at number one on the chart. The album was certified double platinum by the Recording Industry Association of America (RIAA).

Recording
Recording sessions took place from 2004 to 2005, with the Record production that was provided by Timbaland, Mike City, Sean Garrett and Jim Jonsin, among others. The album serves as a follow-up to the release of Peep This (1994), making it his first studio release in eleven years.

Critical reception

Unpredictable received polarized reviews from music critics. At Metacritic, which assigns a normalized rating out of 100 to reviews from critics, the album received an average score of 52, which indicates "mixed or average reviews", based on 16 reviews. 
E! Online – 7.5 out of 10 -"Whether he makes it all work via his musical skills or chameleonic acting ability, we don't know, but it does work." 
Rolling Stone – 6 out of 10 – "When the album works, it's because of Foxx's easy charm and A-list confidence." 
Paste- 3 out of 10 – "It's better to be the imitation Ray Charles than the poor man's R. Kelly." 
Q magazine – 4 out of 10 – "The voice that set such a spark to West's Gold Digger should be capable of more than this exaggerated comedy sex routine." 
Alex Petridis of The Guardian was also not impressed with the album, saying: "Unpredictable resembles another legendary thespian's venture into pop, William Shatner's 1968 opus The Transformed Man, in that you start to wonder whether Foxx is actually serious or not."

Commercial performance
Unpredictable debuted at number two on the US Billboard 200 chart, selling 597,000 copies in its first week. The album debuted behind Mary J. Blige's The Breakthrough album. In its second week, the album climbed to number one on the chart, selling an additional 200,000 copies. 
Foxx became the fourth Academy Award-winning actor with a number-one album on the US Billboard 200 chart. In its third week, the album remained at number one on the chart, selling 131,000 more copies. In its fourth week, the album remained at number one on the chart, selling 103,000 copies. On March 24, 2006, the album was certified double platinum by the Recording Industry Association of America (RIAA) for sales of over two million copies in the United States.

Track listing

Charts

Weekly charts

Year-end charts

Certifications

References

External links 
 https://news.yahoo.com/s/eo/20051229/en_music_eo/18046
 http://www.billboard.com/articles/news/60198/foxx-overtakes-blige-on-album-chart

Jamie Foxx albums
2005 albums
J Records albums
Albums produced by Timbaland
Albums produced by Sean Garrett
Albums produced by Polow da Don
Albums produced by Jim Jonsin
Albums produced by Kanye West
Albums produced by No I.D.
Albums produced by Mr. Collipark
Albums produced by Theron Feemster
Albums produced by the Underdogs (production team)
Albums produced by Warryn Campbell